The CONCACAF Women's Under-17 tournament is a football (soccer) competition for women's national teams under 17 years of age in North America, Central America, and the Caribbean region and is the qualification tournament for the FIFA U-17 Women's World Cup. A tournament is an eight-nation event, with three teams qualifying for the World Cup.

History

2008
After sanctioning its first women's youth world championship in 2002, FIFA added the FIFA U-17 Women's World Cup to its calendar of events in 2008. CONCACAF, likewise, began its U-17 Women's Championship the same year, staging the inaugural event in Trinidad & Tobago. The United States won the inaugural U-17 Women's Championship, defeating Costa Rica 4–1 in the final.

2012
The qualification process for the 2012 tournament started on 14 August 2011.

Results

Performance by team

Participating nations

Awards

Golden Boot

Golden Ball

Golden Glove

CONCACAF Fair Play Award

Winning coaches

See also
 FIFA Women's U-17 World Cup
 CONCACAF Women's U-20 Championship
 CONCACAF U17 Championship

Notes

References

External links
 Official Site
 Tournament and qualification on soccerway.com

 
U-17 Championship
Under-17 association football
Recurring sporting events established in 2008
2008 establishments in North America